Jutta Hipp with Zoot Sims is an album by German jazz pianist Jutta Hipp recorded in 1956 which was released on the Blue Note label as BLP 1530.

Reception
The AllMusic review by Scott Yanow and Thom Jurek awarded the albums 4½ stars stating "as a whole, this recording is so wonderfully executed, one has to wonder why Hipp simply dropped out of the jazz world". 

Writing in the liner notes for the album, jazz critic Leonard Feather said:
The total effect to be observed on these two sides is similar to what you would experience if you happened to drop in one night at Basin Street or the bohemia and found Jutta Hipp sitting in with Zoot's combo. The same laissez-souffler (or man, let's blow) spirit; the same concentration on individual expression. If fact, everything is there but the audience applause; it only remains to be hoped that you'll feel like providing it yourself.

Track listing
 "Just Blues" (Zoot Sims) – 8:42
 "Violets for Your Furs" (Matt Dennis, Tom Adair) – 6:10
 "Down Home" (Jerry Lloyd) – 6:43
 "Almost Like Being in Love" (Alan Jay Lerner, Frederick Loewe) – 6:16
 "Wee Dot" (J. J. Johnson, Leo Parker) – 7:28
 "Too Close for Comfort" (Jerry Bock, George David Weiss, Larry Holofcener) – 6:52
 "These Foolish Things" (Harry Link, Holt Marvell, Jack Strachey) – 6:12 Bonus track on CD reissue
 "'S Wonderful" (George Gershwin, Ira Gershwin) – 5:54 Bonus track on CD reissue

Personnel
Jutta Hipp – piano
Zoot Sims – tenor saxophone
Jerry Lloyd – trumpet
Ahmed Abdul-Malik – bass
Ed Thigpen – drums

References

Blue Note Records albums
Jutta Hipp albums
1957 albums
Albums produced by Alfred Lion
Albums recorded at Van Gelder Studio